Timo Tammemaa (born 18 November 1991) is an Estonian volleyball player, member of the Estonia men's national volleyball team. At the professional club level, he plays for Czarni Radom.

Club career
Timo Tammemaa began his professional career in 2009, when he signed a contract with the Estonian team, Selver Tallinn. In 2014, he moved to Pärnu alongside his coach, Avo Keel, and his teammate Hindrek Pulk. After two seasons, he joined the French team, Spacer's Toulouse. Tammemaa moved to Belgium in the next season to play for Noliko Maaseik. He extended the contract with Noliko for one more season in April 2018. In July 2019, he signed a contract with the top French team, Tours VB. After a year in France Tammemaa moved to Polish PlusLiga and signed with Asseco Resovia.

Estonian national team
As a member of the senior Estonian national volleyball team, Tammemaa competed at the 2015, 2017, 2019 and 2021 European Championships.

Sporting achievements

Clubs
 Baltic League
  2009/2010 – with Selver Tallinn
  2010/2011 – with Selver Tallinn
  2011/2012 – with Selver Tallinn
  2013/2014 – with Selver Tallinn
  2015/2016 – with Pärnu

 National championships
 2009/2010  Estonian Cup, with Selver Tallinn
 2009/2010  Estonian Championship, with Selver Tallinn
 2010/2011  Estonian Cup, with Selver Tallinn
 2010/2011  Estonian Championship, with Selver Tallinn
 2011/2012  Estonian Cup, with Selver Tallinn
 2011/2012  Estonian Championship, with Selver Tallinn
 2012/2013  Estonian Cup, with Selver Tallinn
 2012/2013  Estonian Championship, with Selver Tallinn
 2013/2014  Estonian Championship, with Selver Tallinn
 2014/2015  Estonian Cup, with Pärnu
 2014/2015  Estonian Championship, with Pärnu
 2015/2016  Estonian Cup, with Pärnu
 2015/2016  Estonian Championship, with Pärnu
 2016/2017  French Championship, with Spacer's de Toulouse
 2017/2018  Belgian Championship, with Noliko Maaseik
 2018/2019  Belgian SuperCup, with Noliko Maaseik
 2018/2019  Belgian Championship, with Noliko Maaseik

Individual awards
 2016: Baltic League – Best Middle Blocker

References

External links
 
 Player profile at PlusLiga.pl 
 Player profile at Volleybox.net

1991 births
Living people
Sportspeople from Kuressaare
Estonian men's volleyball players
Estonian expatriate volleyball players
Estonian expatriate sportspeople in France
Expatriate volleyball players in France
Estonian expatriate sportspeople in Belgium
Expatriate volleyball players in Belgium
Estonian expatriate sportspeople in Poland
Expatriate volleyball players in Poland
Resovia (volleyball) players
Czarni Radom players
Middle blockers